The themes or  (singular:) were the main military/administrative divisions of the middle Byzantine Empire. They were established in the mid-7th century in the aftermath of the Slavic invasion of the Balkans and Muslim conquests of parts of Byzantine territory, and replaced the earlier provincial system established by Diocletian and Constantine the Great. In their origin, the first themes were created from the areas of encampment of the field armies of the East Roman army, and their names corresponded to the military units that had existed in those areas. The theme system reached its apogee in the 9th and 10th centuries, as older themes were split up and the conquest of territory resulted in the creation of new ones. The original theme system underwent significant changes in the 11th and 12th centuries, but the term remained in use as a provincial and financial circumscription until the very end of the Empire.

History

Background
During the late 6th and early 7th centuries, the Byzantine Empire was under frequent attack from all sides. The Sassanid Empire was pressing from the east on Syria, Egypt, and Anatolia. Slavs and Avars raided Thrace, Macedonia, Illyricum and southern Greece and settled in the Balkans. The Lombards occupied northern Italy, largely unopposed. In order to face the mounting pressure, in the more distant provinces of the West, recently regained by Justinian I (r. 527–565), Emperor Maurice (r. 582–602) combined supreme civil and military authority in the person of an exarch, a viceroy, forming the exarchates of Ravenna and Africa. These developments overturned the strict division of civil and military offices, which had been one of the cornerstones of the reforms of Diocletian (r. 284–305). Said administrative restructurings also found a precedent in Justinian's broad reorganization in the western conquests, denoting combined powers to the newly stablished Praetorian prefects of Africa (Eparchos tes Afrikís) and Italy (Eparchos tes Italías) respectively.

The empire maintained this precedent structure until the 640s, when the eastern part of the Empire faced the onslaught of the Muslim Caliphate. The rapid Muslim conquest of Syria and Egypt and consequent Byzantine losses in manpower and territory meant that the Empire found itself struggling for survival.

In order to respond to this unprecedented crisis, the Empire was drastically reorganized. As stablished by Hellenistic political practice, philosophies and Orthodox doctrines, power had been concentrated in military leaders strategoi who acted as viceroys in their respective "théma", being appointed by the emperor alone. Their main function around each was the collection of taxes from the different communities "chora", "komai" and from the different states "proasteion" as well as the management of fast and flexible provincial armies.

Origins
The origin and early nature of the themes has been heavily disputed amongst scholars. The very name  is of uncertain etymology, but most scholars follow Constantine Porphyrogennetos, who records that it originates from Greek  ("placement"). The date of their creation is also uncertain. For most of the 20th century, the establishment of the themes was attributed to the Emperor Heraclius (r. 610–641), during the last of the Byzantine–Sassanid Wars. Most notable amongst the supporters of this thesis was George Ostrogorsky who based this opinion on an extract from the chronicle of Theophanes the Confessor mentioning the arrival of Heraclius "in the lands of the themes" for the year 622. According to Ostrogorsky, this "shows that the process of establishing troops (themes) in specific areas of Asia Minor has already begun at this time." This view has been objected to by other historians however, and more recent scholarship dates their creation later, to the period from the 640s to the 660s, under Constans II (r. 641–668). It has further been shown that, contrary to Ostrogorsky's conception of the  being established from the outset as distinct, well-defined regions where a  held joint military and civil authority, the term  originally seems to have referred exclusively to the armies themselves, and only in the later 7th or early 8th centuries did it come to be transferred to the districts where these armies were encamped as well.

Tied to the question of chronology is also the issue of a corresponding social and military transformation. The traditional view, championed by Ostrogorsky, holds that the establishment of the themes also meant the creation of a new type of army. In his view, instead of the old force, heavily reliant on foreign mercenaries, the new Byzantine army was based on native farmer-soldiers living on state-leased military estates (compare the organization of the Sasanian ). More recent scholars however have posited that the formation of the themes did not constitute a radical break with the past, but rather a logical extension of pre-existing, 6th-century trends, and that its direct social impact was minimal.

First themes: 640s–770s 

What is clear is that at some point in the mid-7th century, probably in the late 630s and 640s, the Empire's field armies were withdrawn to Anatolia, the last major contiguous territory remaining to the Empire, and assigned to the districts that became known as the themes. Territorially, each of the new themes encompassed several of the older provinces, and with a few exceptions, seems to have followed the old provincial boundaries. The first four themes were those of the Armeniacs, Anatolics and Thracesians, and the Opsician theme. The Armeniac Theme, first mentioned in 667, was the successor of the Army of Armenia. It occupied the old areas of the Pontus, Armenia Minor and northern Cappadocia, with its capital at Amasea. The Anatolic Theme, first mentioned in 669, was the successor of the Army of the East. It covered southern central Asia Minor, and its capital was Amorium. Together, these two themes formed the first tier of defence of Byzantine Anatolia, bordering Muslim Armenia and Syria respectively. The Thracesian Theme, first mentioned clearly as late as c. 740, was the successor of the Army of Thrace, and covered the central western coast of Asia Minor (Ionia, Lydia and Caria), with its capital most likely at Chonae. The Opsician Theme, first mentioned in 680, was constituted from the imperial retinue (in Latin ). It covered northwestern Asia Minor (Bithynia, Paphlagonia and parts of Galatia), and was based at Nicaea.

In addition, the great naval division of the Carabisians or Karabisianoi ("people of the  [ships]"), first mentioned in 680, was probably formed of the remains of the Army of the Illyricum or, more likely, the old quaestura exercitus. It never formed a theme proper, but occupied parts of the southern coast of Asia Minor and the Aegean Islands, with its  seat most likely at Samos. It provided the bulk of the Byzantine navy facing the new Arab fleets, which after the Battle of the Masts contested control of the Mediterranean with the Empire. In the event, the Carabisians would prove unsatisfactory in that role, and by 720 they had been disbanded in favour of a fully fledged naval theme, that of the Cibyrrhaeots (Thema Kibyrrhaiotōn), which encompassed the southern coasts of Asia Minor and the Aegean islands.

The part of the region of Thrace under Byzantine control was probably constituted as a theme at about 680, as a response to the Bulgar threat, although for a time the command over Thrace appears to have been exercised by the Count of the Opsikion. Successive campaigns by the emperors of the Heraclian dynasty in Greece also led to the recovery of control of Central Greece from Slavic invaders, and to the establishment of the theme of Hellas there between 687 and 695. Sicily too was formed as a theme by the end of the 7th century, but the imperial possessions in mainland Italy remained under the exarch of Ravenna or the local doukes, as did Byzantine Africa until the fall of Carthage in 698. At the same time, Crete and the imperial exclave of Cherson in the Crimea formed independent archontiai.

Thus, by the turning of the century, the themes had become the dominant feature of imperial administration. Their large size and power however made their generals prone to revolt, as had been evidenced in the turbulent period 695–715, and would again during the great revolt of Artabasdos in 741–742. The suppression of Artabasdos' revolt heralded the first significant changes in the Anatolian themes: the over-mighty Opsikion was broken up with the creation of two new themes, the Bucellarian Theme and the Optimates, while the role of imperial guard was assumed by a new type of professional force, the imperial tagmata.

Height of the theme system, 780s–950s 

Despite the prominence of the themes, it was some time before they became the basic unit of the imperial administrative system. Although they had become associated with specific regions by the early 8th century, it took until the end of the 8th century for the civil fiscal administration to begin being organized around them, instead of following the old provincial system. This process, resulting in unified control over both military and civil affairs of each theme by its strategos, was complete by the mid-9th century, and is the "classical" thematic model mentioned in such works as the Klētorologion and the De Administrando Imperio.

At the same time, the need to protect the Anatolian heartland of Byzantium from the Arab raids led to the creation, in the later 8th and early 9th centuries, of a series of small frontier districts, the kleisourai or kleisourarchiai ("defiles, enclosures"). The term was previously used to signify strategically important, fortified mountain passages, and was now expanded to entire districts which formed separate commands under a kleisourarchēs, tasked with guerrilla warfare and locally countering small to mid-scale incursions and raids. Gradually, most of these were elevated to full themes.

Decline of the system, 960s–1070s 
With the beginning of the Byzantine offensives in the East and the Balkans in the 10th century, especially under the warrior-emperors Nikephoros II (r. 963–969), John I Tzimiskes (r. 969–976) and Basil II (r. 976–1025), newly gained territories were also incorporated into themes, although these were generally smaller than the original themes established in the 7th and 8th centuries.

At this time, a new class of themes, the so-called "minor" or "Armenian" themes appear, which Byzantine sources clearly differentiate from the traditional "great" or "Roman" themes. As their name reveals, they were mostly populated by Armenians, either indigenous or settled there by the Byzantine authorities. One of their peculiarities was the extremely large number of officers (the theme of Charpezikion alone counted 22 senior and 47 junior tourmarchai).

While well suited for defence, the "Armenian" themes were incapable of responding to major invasions or undertake sustained offensive campaigns on their own. Thus, from the 960s, more and more professional regiments, both from the old tagmata and newly raised formations, were stationed along the border. To command them as well as coordinate the forces of the small frontier themes, a number of large regional commands ("" or ""), under a doux or katepano, were set up. In the East, the three original such commands, set up by John Tzimiskes, were those of the doukes of Antioch, Chaldia and Mesopotamia. As Byzantium expanded into Greater Armenia in the early 11th century, these were complemented or replaced by the commands of Iberia, Vaspurakan, Edessa and Ani. In the same vein, the "Armenian" themes seem to have been placed under a single strategos in the mid-11th century.

The series of soldier-emperors culminating in Basil II led to a situation where by 1025 Byzantium was more powerful than any of its enemies. At the same time, the mobile, professional forces of the tagmata gained in importance over the old thematic armies (and fleets) of the interior, which soon began to be neglected. Indeed, from the early 11th century military service was increasingly commuted to cash payments. While the frontier ducates were able to meet most local threats, the dissolution of the old theme-based defensive system deprived the Byzantine defensive system of any strategic depth. Coupled with increasing reliance on foreign mercenaries and the forces of allied and vassal states,  as well as the revolts and civil wars resulting from the widening rift between the civilian bureaucracy in Constantinople and the land-holding military elites (the dynatoi), by the time of the Battle of Manzikert in 1071, the Byzantine army was already undergoing a severe crisis and collapsed completely in the battle's aftermath.

Change and decline: 11th–12th centuries 

The Komnenian era saw a brief restoration of the empire's fortunes as the force now known as the 'Komnenian army' was established by Alexios I Komnenos, marking a decisive break with the theme system. The new force was highly centralised in the person of the emperor and the ruling dynasty, and provided an element of stability which characterised the Komnenian restoration. It was noticeably more heavily reliant on mercenaries such as the Varangian guard than the previous army. The strategoi increasingly lost power and the themes lost much of their military character. The independence they had previously enjoyed as a means to deal with local issues was being steadily lost.

The Komnenian restoration required a new dynamic to manage the severely weakened themes of Asia Minor due to Manzikert's catastrophe. Built on the same key principles, markedly increasing the quality and centralization of the provinces and thus the great cost of maintaining them, the new military regents called Doux or Katepanos indiscriminately, assumed strongly centralizing roles on the king's behalf so that the influx of landed pronoia foreigners in military service could be regulated and counteracted in cases of uprising, said positions were specifically reserverd to relatives of the Komnenian family alone and though efficient emergency measures, it successfully turned the kingdom into a dependency on foreign mercenaries, yielding the mass of native Greeks and making it unprecedentedly sublime to the will of its European counterparts.

Each Thema was now managed by Katepanos or Doux, vice-regents belonging to the imperial family denoting military and administrative powers, subdivided into Katepanakias encompassing the old Tourmas, now each ruled by a Praktor instead of a Tourmarches fullfiling the same civic and military roles now widely in the hands of pronoias guaranteed mercenaries who now become the bulk of the imperial tagmata's reserves slowly also taking their place side by side with the now totally lawless landed monasteries and the dynatoi who, after Alexio's tax reforms, could formalize the various illegally acquired towns and communes as long as they could secure the full taxation of their new domains by the fisc, a process worse fueled by the extensive chrysobulas of different institutions granted by the monarch.

The Byzantine army of the Komnenian era, however, never managed to field the manpower of the themes in their heyday, and the new system proved more expensive to maintain in the long run. It also relied on a succession of strong soldier-emperors to be effective. With the death of Manuel I Komnenos in 1180, a new period of decline set in.

Late Byzantine themata 

The neglect under the Angeloi dynasty and the weakening of central authority made the themes increasingly irrelevant in the late 12th century. Regional civil authorities such as the 'despotates' grew in power as central authority collapsed, rendering the themes moribund by the onset of the Palaiologos dynasty's rule.

The deplorable state of the empire at this point did not allow any further administrative innovations, the Komnenian structural legacy still fully present even when its countermeasure no longer served its purpose.

The still irrelevant micro provinces under imperial control were organized directly into katepanakias or kephalatikion each also ruled by a Katepan or Kephale with military and civic powers centered around forts and major passes, relegating all minor tasks to deputies.

Organization
The term thema was ambiguous, referring both to a form of military tenure and to an administrative division. A theme was an arrangement of plots of land given for farming to the soldiers "stratiotai" coexisting with different villages and towns, "Komai", "Chora" which were taxed for rapid and continuous revenue for the state with an easy and simple handling for a more direct control of the empire by the emperor alone or his viceroys, which ultimately, was a simplified Hellenistic and fiscal administrative principle adapted for war times. The soldiers were still technically a military unit, under the command of a strategos, they did not own the land they worked as it was still controlled by the state. Therefore, for its use the soldiers' pay was reduced. By accepting this proposition, the participants agreed that their descendants would also serve in the military and work in a theme, thus simultaneously reducing the need for unpopular conscription as well as cheaply maintaining the military. It also allowed for the settling of conquered lands, as there was always a substantial addition made to public lands "proasteion" during a conquest.

The commander of a theme, however, did not only command his soldiers.  He united the civil and military jurisdictions in the territorial area in question.  Thus the division set up by Diocletian between civil governors (praesides etc.) and military commanders (duces etc.) was abolished, and the Empire returned to a system much more similar to that of the Republic or the Principate and directly linkeable to the system of Eparchies and Strategiai  set up in the Hellenistic Seleucid and Mithridatric Kingdoms respectively, which were military in origin and organization as well, where provincial governors had also commanded the armies in their area.

The following table illustrates the thematic structure as found in the Thracesian Theme, c. 902-936:

List of the themes between c. 660 and 930 
This list includes the large "traditional" themes established in the period from the inception of the theme system in c. 660 to the beginning of the great conquests in c. 930 and the creation of the new, smaller themes.

Notes:
† naval theme (in Greek , θέμα ναυτικόν)
§ Originally established as a kleisoura

List of new themes, 930s–1060s
These were the new major or minor themes (provinces), established during the Byzantine conquests, in the East (the so-called "Armenian" themes or generalships), in Italy and in the Balkans.

Later themes, 12th–13th centuries

References

Sources

External links

 
Types of administrative division
Military units and formations of the Byzantine Empire